Glenda Estefania Morejón Quiñónez (born 30 May 2000) is an Ecuadorian racewalker. On 27 July 2017, she won the 5000m category of the IAAF World U18 Championships, becoming the second female Ecuadorian athlete to do so.

Biography
Glenda Morejón was born on 30 May 2000 in Ibarra, Ecuador. She was educated in Ibarra at the Tarquino Jaramillo School.

Glenda Morejón comes from a family of medium-low social status, her father Luis Morejón is a professional, in addition to helping with domestic chores, her mother María del Carmen Quiñónez works in the 24 de Mayo market in the city of Otavalo and her sister María Belén, who follows in her footsteps  is a walker. At the age of thirteen Glenda began to practice in the field of Olympic walks, along with the help of her coach Giovan Delgado a Guayaquil graduated in Physical Culture who works in the Educational Unit Ibarra and who lives in Ibarra since 1988, which also founded the Tarquino Jaramillo Athletic School in 2001, where Glenda trains along with 24 other athletes.

With respect to her university education, the Universidad Técnica Particular de Loja (UTPL) has awarded Glenda a sports scholarship that covers 70% of her first cycle tuition and will cover 90% of the total cost of tuition in all cycles of her Business Administration career in open and distance modality.

She won the IAAF World U18 Championships in the  category on 15 July 2017 at the Nyayo National Stadium in Nairobi, in the face of doubts of her ability because of inexperience and young age. She won with a time of 22:32:30, ahead of athletes Meryem Bekmez (Turkey) and Elvira Khasanova (Russia). Morejón is the second Ecuador athlete to win in the World Under 18 Champions, the first of which being Maribel Caicedo in 2015.

Despite her record of winning acclaim for Latin America, Morejón has had difficulty securing funding for her training or equipment. She trained with patched and holed shoes, drank tap water, and used aguapanela as an energizer. Despite a local campaign by Morejón's management, she had to go alone to Nairobi and with basic equipment. Ecuador's Ministry of Sport has denied funding for Morejón despite international protest.

In May the 5th, 2018 she won the silver medal in the World Championship held in Taicang, China.

Tokyo 2020 
Although she has won four international contests, she was as considered a substitute athlete for the Tokyo 2020 Olympic Games. However, in 2019, Glenda Morejón was promoted to the High Performance Plan, the Olympic competitor program from the Sport Secretary in Ecuador.

Currently, Morojón is training for the next Olympic games along with other Ecuadorian athletes, such as Alex Quiñonez, Neisi Dajomes, etc.

Sport career

References

Living people
2000 births
Ecuadorian female racewalkers
World Youth Championships in Athletics winners
Athletes (track and field) at the 2020 Summer Olympics
Olympic athletes of Ecuador
21st-century Ecuadorian women
People from Ibarra, Ecuador
South American Championships in Athletics winners
South American Games gold medalists for Ecuador
South American Games medalists in athletics
Athletes (track and field) at the 2022 South American Games